Pavol Skalický (born October 9, 1995) is a Slovak professional ice hockey player. He is currently playing for HC TPS in the Finnish Liiga.

Skalicky made his Swedish Hockey League debut playing with Örebro HK during the 2014–15 SHL season. After three seasons in the Kontinental Hockey League with Slovak club, HC Slovan Bratislava, Skalicky left as a free agent in securing a one-year contract with Czech top tier club, BK Mladá Boleslav, of the ELH on May 1, 2018.

Career statistics

Regular season and playoffs

International

Awards and honors

References

External links

1995 births
Living people
People from Gelnica
Sportspeople from the Košice Region
HC '05 Banská Bystrica players
Lukko players
BK Mladá Boleslav players
HC Košice players
Örebro HK players
Slovak ice hockey forwards
HC Slovan Bratislava players
HK Spišská Nová Ves players
HC TPS players
Slovak expatriate ice hockey players in Sweden
Slovak expatriate ice hockey players in Finland
Slovak expatriate ice hockey players in the Czech Republic